Jesse Samuel Gabriel (born September 25, 1981) is an American attorney and politician serving as a member of the California State Assembly. Gabriel represents the California's 46th State Assembly district, which includes much of the eastern San Fernando Valley, including Encino, Tarzana, Reseda, and Van Nuys.

Early life and career
Gabriel was born in Berkeley, California, and raised in Oak Park, California. In 2004, he graduated summa cum laude from the University of California, Berkeley with a bachelor's degree in political science. At Berkeley, Gabriel served as student government president in the Associated Students of the University of California during the 2002–03 academic year. He earned his Juris Doctor from Harvard Law School, where he received the Dean's Award for Community Leadership from then Dean and now U.S. Supreme Court Associate Justice Elena Kagan.

Career 
From 2008 to 2010, he served as counsel to Evan Bayh while Bayh was serving as a member of the United States Senate.

Before being elected to the California State Assembly, Gabriel worked as a constitutional rights and general litigation attorney for Gibson, Dunn & Crutcher in Los Angeles, where he was a part of the firm's litigation and public policy groups. Gabriel's most notable cases included representing victims of domestic abuse, Holocaust survivors, and groups facing hate-motivated violence. In 2017, he filed two lawsuits against the Trump Administration on behalf of young illegal immigrants, also known as Dreamers, who were protected by the Deferred Action for Childhood Arrivals (DACA) program. He received the California Lawyer Attorney of the Year award from The Daily Journal in 2018.

Gabriel previously served a board member of the Jewish Federation of Greater Los Angeles and the League of Conservation Voters before his election in 2018. He has also previously sat on the Los Angeles County Commission on Local Governmental Services.

California Assembly
Following Matt Dababneh's resignation from the California State Assembly after numerous charges of sexual harassment, effective December 31, 2017, Gabriel announced his candidacy in a special election to replace him in California's 45th State Assembly district. Gabriel won the special election on June 5, 2018, earning 65.7 percent of the vote. He was sworn into office on June 11. He won reelection to his first full term in the November 2018 General Election against Justin Clark, winning with 70.3 percent of the vote.

Shortly after assuming office, Gabriel was appointed to the State Assembly Leadership as Assistant Majority Whip under Majority Whip Todd Gloria. He also was elected by his colleagues as Vice Chair of the California Legislative Jewish Caucus under Chair Ben Allen. During his first full term in the State Assembly, Gabriel authored nine bills that were signed into law by Governor Gavin Newsom, including legislation to expand legal services for low-income Californians in civil cases and to establish a Nonprofit Security Grant Program to improve the physical security of nonprofit organizations that are at high risk of violent attacks or hate crimes. Gabriel was one of 100 leaders from across the state in 2019 to be recognized as a "California Influencer" by The Sacramento Bee.

Gabriel also co-founded a legislative working group in 2019 that hosted former Congresswoman and gun control advocate Gabrielle Giffords, the Brady Campaign, and Moms Demand Action with the purpose of discussing gun control in California and enacting more than a dozen new gun safety measures.

Gabriel currently serves on the Appropriations Committee, as well as the Committees on Banking and Finance, Higher Education, Housing and Community Development, and Privacy and Consumer Protection. He is also the Chair of the Select Committee on Jobs and Innovation in the San Fernando Valley and a member of the Select Committee on Women's Reproductive Health as well the Select Committee on Police Reform.

2018 Election

2020 Election

Personal life
Gabriel lives in Encino with his wife Rachel Rosner, an affordable housing attorney, and their three sons.

References

External links

Living people
California lawyers
People from Encino, Los Angeles
University of California, Berkeley alumni
Harvard Law School alumni
Jewish American state legislators in California
Democratic Party members of the California State Assembly
1981 births
People associated with Gibson Dunn
21st-century American politicians
21st-century American Jews